This is a list of Kurdish language television channels.

Iraqi Kurdistan (Bashur)

Turkish Kurdistan (Bakur) 
TRT Kurdî – Turkish state channel (pro-government )
Zarok TV – Kurdish Children's channel (animation)

Defunct
These television channels were shut down in the course of the 2016 Turkish purges.
Denge TV - based in Diyarbakır 
Dîjle TV - based in Diyarbakır 
Dünya TV - based in Gaziantep
Batman TV
Amed TV - based in Diyarbakır (Kurdish: Amed)
Gün TV
TV 10
Hayat TV

Iranian Kurdistan (Rojhilat) 
Sahar TV – Multilingual TV based in Tehran, Iran and affiliated to Islamic Republic of Iran Broadcasting (IRIB) which has program in different languages, including Kurdish

Kordestan TV Is the provincial TV of Kordestan province based in Sanandaj. 
Zagros TV Is the provincial TV of Kermanshah province based in Kermanshah. 
Aflak TV  Is the provincial TV of Lorestan province based in Khorramabad. 
Ilam TV Is the Provincial TV of Ilam province based in Ilam and affiliated to IRIB which has program in both Kurdish and Persian
Atrak TV Is the provincial TV of North Khorasan province based in Bojnurd.
Mahabad TV Is the Local TV of Mahabad city and affiliated to IRIB which has program in both Kurdish and Persian.
West Azerbaijan – Provincial TV based in Wirmê (Urmîye or Urmia) and affiliated to IRIB which has program in Kurdish, Azeri and Persian.

Syrian Kurdistan (Rojava) 
Rojava TV – based in Syrian Kurdistan
Ronahî TV – based in Syrian Kurdistan
Minbij TV – Local TV of Manbij 
JIN TV – kurdish feminists channel by the Newa Women's Foundation and dedicated to Sakine Cansız, Fidan Doğan and Leyla Şaylemez who were murdered in Paris in 2013, assassinated by turkish National Intelligence Organization agents, in the Triple murder of Kurdish activists in Paris.

Europe 
ASOsat TV – based in Sweden
Çira tv
Gün TV
KMC TV – based in Sweden, music channel
Komala TV –
Kurd 1 – based in Paris, France, independent Kurdish channel
Medya Haber
Med Muzîk – music channel, pro-PKK
Med Nûçe – based in Europe, for whole Kurdistan, specific northern Kurdistan 
Newroz TV – based in Sweden, PJAK
Rojhelat TV – based in Sweden
Stêrk TV
Ronahî TV – for Syrian Kurdistan
Tishk TV – based in France, KDPI

Defunct

 Med TV
 Roj TV – based in Denmark

References

 
Kurdish
Television channels

Television channels